Demon Knight is the official soundtrack to the 1995 horror film, Demon Knight. It was released on January 10, 1995 through Atlantic Records and mostly consisted of heavy metal and alternative rock, with "1-800 Suicide" by the Gravediggaz being the only hip-hop song. The soundtrack peaked at 157 on the Billboard 200.

Track listing

References

1995 soundtrack albums
Atlantic Records soundtracks
Horror film soundtracks
Comedy film soundtracks